Seguin Independent School District is a public school district based in Seguin, Texas, United States.

In addition to Seguin, the district also serves the communities of McQueeney and Kingsbury.

In 2009 and 2010, the school district was rated "recognized" by the Texas Education Agency.

History

In 2016 Seguin ISD attempted to buy the radio station KWED, owned by Guadalupe Media. The radio station acts as the publisher for the Seguin Daily News. The board of trustees approved a deal in which the district would have paid Guadalupe Media $400,000, to lease the station, with an option to buy it after the payment period of five years ($75,000 per year). The district would have decided which employees would remain at the station. The payments would have been in increments over a five-year period. By August of that year Guadalupe Media backed out of the deal. The radio station had previously aired criticism against the school district. Eliana Reihl, a candidate for a school board position, stated her belief that the district was motivated to silence criticism. Some other critics argued that the radio station was losing money and that the district would have to pay additional money to keep the station afloat.

Schools

Secondary schools
Grades 9-12
 Seguin High School
 Mercer Blumberg Learning Center at Saegert
 Seguin Alternative School

Middle schools
Grades 6-8
A.J. Briesemeister Middle School
Jim Barnes Middle School

Elementary schools
Grades K-5
F.C. Weinert Elementary
George W. Vogel Elementary
Jefferson Elementary
McQueeney Elementary
Oralia Rodriguez Elementary
Robert F. Koennecke Elementary
Vincent Patlán Elementary
Pre-kindergarten
Ball Early Childhood Center

References

External links
 

School districts in Guadalupe County, Texas
Seguin, Texas